Ford v Ferrari is a 2019 sports action drama film directed by James Mangold and distributed by 20th Century Fox. Two soundtrack albums for the film were released on November 15, 2019.

Ford v Ferrari: Original Motion Picture Soundtrack

Ford v Ferrari: Original Motion Picture Soundtrack is the official soundtrack of Ford v Ferrari released by Hollywood Records on November 15, 2019. The album consists of classic 1950s and 1960s music along with three score tracks by Marco Beltrami and Buck Sanders.

Track listing

Ford v Ferrari: Original Score

Ford v Ferrari: Original Score is the soundtrack score to the film composed by Marco Beltrami and Buck Sanders, released by Fox Music on November 15, 2019.

Track listing

References

2019 soundtrack albums
Hollywood Records soundtracks